BAF agar or biotin-aneurin-folic acid agar is a type of agar growth medium containing peptones. It is used to grow cultures of mycorrhizal fungi. The acidic pH (5.8-6.3) of BAF agar inhibits bacterial growth.

Typical composition 

BAF agar typically contains:

 30.0 g/L glucose
 2.0 g/L peptone
 0.2 g/L yeast extract
 0.5 g/L KH2PO4
 0.5 g/L MgSO4.7 H2O
 10.0 mg/L FeCl3.6 H2O
 1.0 mg/L ZnSO4.7 H2O
 5.0 mg/L MnSO4
 100.0 mg/L CaCl2.2 H2O
 50.0 μg/L thiamine HCl
 1.0 μg/L biotin
 100.0 μg/L folic acid
 50.0 μg/L inositol
 15 g/L agar

References 

Microbiological media